Jana Zangiová, née Beránková, is a former ice dancer who represented Czechoslovakia. With Jan Barták, she is the 1981 Prague Skate champion, the 1981 NHK Trophy bronze medalist, the 1982 Ennia Challenge Cup silver medalist, and a two-time Czechoslovak national champion. The duo finished in the top ten at four ISU Championships — 1981 Europeans in Innsbruck, Austria;  1981 Worlds in Hartford, Connecticut, United States; 1982 Europeans in Lyon, France; and 1982 Worlds in Copenhagen, Denmark.

Beránková/Barták teamed up in 1978 and competed together for four seasons. Earlier in her career, she skated with Karol Foltán. After retiring from skating, she became a notary in Prague. She is married to an ophthalmologist, Imran Musa Zangi, and has a son, Filip.

Competitive highlights

With Barták

With Foltán

References

External links 
 

Czechoslovak female ice dancers
Living people
Figure skaters from Prague
Year of birth missing (living people)